Tao Huabi (born January 1947) is a Chinese entrepreneur best known as the founder of Lao Gan Ma or Old Godmother. Tao is a member of the Communist Party of China and a National People's Congress deputy.

Biography
Tao was born in a poverty-stricken village, in Meitan County, Guizhou, in January 1947. She was the eighth girl in the family and wasn't taught how to read or write. During the Great Chinese Famine, she dug for wild vegetables and tried various ways to eat plant roots using whatever she had to try and make the little food her family had taste better.

At the age of 20, Tao married to an accountant in the local geological team and gave birth to two sons: Li Guishan and Li Hui. Not long after, her husband became sick and she had to earn money to cover for her husband's medical costs and support her two sons. She went to Guangzhou to find a factory job as a migrant worker but after her husband died, returned to Guizhou to care for her children. She began to sell rice curd and vegetables in a street stall.

In 1989, Tao opened up her own restaurant in Guiyang, Guizhou where she sold simple noodles with spicy hot sauce with soybeans. She became known as a "godmother" to poor students as she would always give them discounts and some extra food. Her restaurant began to gain popularity, particularly for its sauce. Customers would come to purchase the sauce by itself and Tao took notice. In the early 1990s, more truck drivers passed by Tao's shop due to the construction of a new highway nearby; she started giving out her sauces for free for the truckers to take home, marketing her sauce by word of mouth.

By late 1994, she stopped selling noodles and turned her restaurant into a specialty store to sell her sauces, primarily her chili oil sauce. In 1994, she borrowed two houses of the CPC Yunguan Village Committee in the Nanming District, recruited forty workers, and started her own sauce factory. By 1997, the company was officially listed and open for business. Though the brand was successful almost immediately after launching, it struggled to deal with competing brands with similar packaging. In 2001, the high court in Beijing finally ruled that other similar products could not use the "Lao Gan Ma" name nor imitate its packaging. Tao received 400,000 RMB (60,000 USD) in compensation.

Tao is also a member of the Communist Party of China and is politically active as a representative of the standing Committee of the Guizhou Provincial People's Congress.

References

Bibliography

1947 births
Living people
People from Zunyi
Chinese women company founders
21st-century Chinese businesswomen
21st-century Chinese businesspeople